Hetton is a small Dales village in the Craven district of North Yorkshire, England, situated 5.75 miles north of Skipton by the B6265 road. It is the largest settlement in the civil parish of Hetton-cum-Bordley. The population of the former civil parish of Hetton taken at the 2011 Census was 155.

Nearby places include Rylstone, Cracoe, Flasby, Threapland and Winterburn.

Hetton was historically part of the township of Hetton with Bordley in the ancient parish of Burnsall in the West Riding of Yorkshire.  In the late 19th century it became a separate township, and it became a separate civil parish in 1866.  It was transferred to the new county of North Yorkshire in 1974.  The civil parish was abolished in 2012 and amalgamated with the parish of Bordley to form the new civil parish of Hetton-cum-Bordley.

References

External links

Villages in North Yorkshire
Former civil parishes in North Yorkshire
Craven District